Zofia Szcześniewska-Bryszewska (31 August 1943 – 2 December 1988) was a former Polish volleyball player, a member of Poland women's national volleyball team in 1963–1970, a bronze medalist of the Olympic Games (Tokyo 1964, Mexico 1968), silver medalist of the European Championship (1963 and 1967), four-time Polish Champion (1963, 1964, 1965, 1966).

External links
 

1943 births
1988 deaths
Olympic volleyball players of Poland
Volleyball players at the 1964 Summer Olympics
Volleyball players at the 1968 Summer Olympics
Olympic bronze medalists for Poland
Polish women's volleyball players
Olympic medalists in volleyball
Volleyball players from Warsaw
Medalists at the 1968 Summer Olympics
Medalists at the 1964 Summer Olympics